The men's foil was one of eight fencing events on the fencing at the 1968 Summer Olympics programme. It was the fifteenth appearance of the event. The competition was held from 15 to 16 October 1968. 64 fencers from 25 nations competed. Nations had been limited to three fencers each since 1928. The event was won by Ion Drîmbă of Romania, the nation's first medal in the men's foil. Silver went to Jenő Kamuti, the first medal for Hungary in the event since 1948. Daniel Revenu of France repeated as the bronze medalist, the sixth man to win multiple medals in the event.

Background

This was the 15th appearance of the event, which has been held at every Summer Olympics except 1908 (when there was a foil display only rather than a medal event). Seven of the eight quarterfinalists (all but the champion) from 1964 returned: silver medalist Jean Claude Magnan and bronze medalist Daniel Revenu of France, fourth-place finisher Roland Losert of Austria, fifth-place finisher Jenő Kamuti of Hungary, sixth-place finisher Tim Gerresheim of the United Team of Germany (now competing for West Germany), and joint seventh-place finishers Sándor Szabó of Hungary and Henry Hoskyns of Great Britain. The Soviet team included the last two world champions: German Sveshnikov and Viktor Putyatin. Romania held the team world championship.

Lebanon, Paraguay, and Puerto Rico each made their debut in the men's foil; West Germany competed separately for the first time. The United States made its 14th appearance, most of any nation, having missed only the inaugural 1896 competition.

Competition format

The 1968 tournament continued to use a mix of pool play and knockout rounds, but with substantial changes from 1964. The first two rounds were round-robin pool play, followed by a knockout round, finishing with another pool for the final. Early-round barrages were eliminated and the knockout round was a modified double elimination round.

 Round 1: 12 pools, with 5 or 6 fencers in each pool. The top 4 fencers in each pool advanced, cutting the field from 64 to 48.
 Round 2: 8 pools, with 6 fencers per pool. Again, the top 4 fencers advanced, reducing the number of remaining fencers from 48 to 32.
 Knockout round: This was a modified double-elimination tournament. The 32 fencers were divided into 4 groups of 8. The winner of the "winners bracket" in each group advanced to the final pool. The winner of the "losers bracket" from each group faced the winner of a different group's "losers bracket," with the winner of that match advancing to the final pool as well. The knockout round winnowed the fencers from 32 to 6.
 Final round: A final pool with the 6 remaining fencers determined the medals and 4th through 6th place. A barrage was used if necessary.

Schedule

All times are Central Standard Time (UTC-6)

Results

Round 1

Round 1 Pool A

Round 1 Pool B

Round 1 Pool C

Round 1 Pool D

Round 1 Pool E

Round 1 Pool F

Round 1 Pool G

Round 1 Pool H

Round 1 Pool I

Round 1 Pool J

Round 1 Pool K

Round 1 Pool L

Round 2

Round 2 Pool A

Round 2 Pool B

Round 2 Pool C

Round 2 Pool D

Round 2 Pool E

Round 2 Pool F

Round 2 Pool G

Round 2 Pool H

Double elimination rounds

Winners brackets

Winners group 1

Winners group 2

Winners group 3

Winners group 4

Losers brackets

Losers group 1

Losers group 2

Final round 

 Barrage

References

Foil men
Men's events at the 1968 Summer Olympics